Hopgood is a surname. Notable people with the surname include:

Alan Hopgood (born 1934), Australian actor and writer
Don Hopgood (born 1938), Australian politician
Carl Hopgood (born 1972), British sculptor
Hoon-Yung Hopgood (born 1974), American politician
Jeff Hopgood (1948–2006), Australian rules footballer
Kev Hopgood (born 1961), English comic artist
Paul Hopgood (born 1973), Australian rules footballer
Stephen Hopgood (born 1965), British political scientist